A referendum on the withdrawal of Russian troops was held in Transnistria on 27 March 1995 alongside parliamentary elections. Russian troops had been stationed in Transnistria since the 1992 Transnistria War. Over 93% of voted in favour of the troops remaining in the territory.

Results

References

Referendums in Transnistria
Referendums in Moldova
1995 in Moldova
1995 in Transnistria
1995 referendums